Enippadigal is a 1979 Indian Tamil-language film directed by P. Madhavan and produced by K. S. Sethumadhavan. It is a remake of the 1978 Telugu film Seetamalakshmi. The film stars Sivakumar and Shoba. It was released on 16 February 1979.

Plot 

Chella Kannu, a young sweeper becomes a popular movie star known as Kamala Devi. Her lover and fellow sweeper Manickam is the ladder of her success, but the villainy of her brother separates them.

Cast 
 Sivakumar as Manickam
 Shoba as Chella Kannu (Kamala Devi)
 Sathyaraj as Muthu (Chella Kannu's brother)

 Manorama as Jayanthi
 Vadivukkarasi as Rani
 T. M. Sami Kannu as Samykannu
 A. Sakunthala as Chokkamma (Muthu's wife)
 P. T. Sivam as Ramalingam
G. Srinivasan as Chella Kannu's father

 Mohan Sharma (cameo appearance)

Cameo appearances
 V. S. Raghavan as himself
 Kannan as Sambath
 V. Gopalakrishnan as himself
 S. Rama Rao as Singaram

Production 
Ennaipadigal, a remake of the Telugu film Seetamalakshmi (1978), was directed by P. Madhavan and produced by K. S. Sethumadhavan under Ramya Chitra. The story was written by K. Viswanath, and the dialogues by Mahendran. Cinematography was handled by A. Somasundaram, and the editing by T. R. Srinivasalu. N. Seshadri worked as sound engineer.

Soundtrack 
The soundtrack was composed by K. V. Mahadevan, while the lyrics were written by Kannadasan. The song "Kannizhantha" is set in the Carnatic raga known as Hamir Kalyani.

Release and reception 
Enippadigal was released on 16 February 1979. Koushikan of Kalki appreciated the film for various aspects, including the cinematography and direction. The film became a commercial success, and a milestone in Shoba's career. Sujatha Narayanan, writing for The New Indian Express, named Enippadigal as one of her favourite films starring Sivakumar. S. R. Ashok Kumar of The Hindu said that Shoba set "a new trend in realistic portrayals" through her performances in films like Enippadigal.

References

Bibliography

External links 
 

1970s Tamil-language films
1979 films
Films about actors
Films directed by P. Madhavan
Films scored by K. V. Mahadevan
Tamil remakes of Telugu films